Tonje is a Danish, Norwegian and Swedish feminine given name that originated from Old Norse as a short form of Antona and a variant of Torny that is in use in Denmark, Greenland, Norway and Sweden.

Origin 
It has several origins:
 Norwegian dialectal variant form of Tone and Torny
 Short form of Antonie (Tonja)

Notable people 
 Tonje Angelsen (born 1990), Norwegian high jumper
 Tonje Berglie (born 1992), Norwegian handball player
 Tonje Enkerud (born 1994), Norwegian handball player
 Tonje Hessen Schei (born 1971), Norwegian film director, producer and screenwriter.
 Tonje Kjærgaard (born 1975), Danish handball player
 Tonje Kristiansen (born 1967), Norwegian sailor
 Tonje Larsen (born 1975), Norwegian handball player
 Tonje Løseth (born 1991), Norwegian handball player
 Tonje Haug Lerstad (born 1996), Norwegian handball player
 Tonje Nøstvold (born 1985), Norwegian handball player
 Tonje Sagstuen (born 1971), Norwegian handball player
 Tonje Strøm (1937 – 2010), Norwegian painter and illustrator

See also

 Tonja (name)
 Tonya (name)
 Tonia (name)
 Tonie (name)
 Tania (name)
 Tanja (name)
 Tanya (name)
Tonye

References 

Danish feminine given names
Norwegian feminine given names
Swedish feminine given names